Poekilloptera is a genus of South American planthoppers in the subfamily Flatinae and is the sole genus in the tribe Poekillopterini.

Species
 Poekilloptera aperta (Melichar, 1901)
 Poekilloptera aurantiaca (Melichar, 1901)
 Poekilloptera fritillaria (Erichson, 1848)
 Poekilloptera melichari (Jacobi, 1904)
 Poekilloptera miliaria (Jacobi, 1904)
 Poekilloptera minor (Melichar, 1901)
 Poekilloptera modesta (Guérin-Méneville, 1834)
 Poekilloptera phalaenoides (Linnaeus, 1758)
 Poekilloptera sicula (Costa, 1840)

References 

Flatidae
Auchenorrhyncha genera